"If You Love Me (Let Me Know)" is a song written by John Rostill that was a 1974 hit single for Olivia Newton-John. It was her second release to hit the top 10 in the United States, reaching number 5 on the pop chart and number 2 on the Easy Listening chart. It also reached number 2 on the Billboard country chart. As with her single "Let Me Be There", Mike Sammes sings a bass harmony. It was nominated for the 1974 Country Music Association Award for Single of the Year.

Record World said that "Another John Rostill tune produced in the style of 'Let Me Be There' should guarantee a similar kind of success saga for her follow-up."

TV performance
Newton-John performed the song along with Andy Gibb and ABBA on the 1978 ABC-TV special Olivia!.

Chart performance

Weekly charts

Year-end charts

Cover versions
Elvis Presley covered the song in concert, a recording of this appears on his 1977 live album Elvis in Concert and on his final studio album Moody Blue.
Tina Turner recorded a version for her debut solo album Tina Turns the Country On! in 1974.
Brian Collins covered the song for Dot Records in 1977. His version went to number 83 on the country chart.

References

External links
 

1974 singles
Olivia Newton-John songs
Songs written by John Rostill
RPM Top Singles number-one singles
Number-one singles in South Africa
MCA Records singles
Song recordings produced by John Farrar
1977 singles
Brian Collins (1970s singer) songs
1974 songs